Shottsuru (塩魚汁) is a pungent regional Japanese fish sauce similar to the Thai nam pla. The authentic version is made from the fish known the hatahata (Arctoscopus japonicus or sailfin sandfish), and its production is associated with the Akita region.

See also

 List of fish sauces

External links
  Information 

Japanese condiments
Fish sauces
Umami enhancers